Old Bedians Sports Centre  is a mixed use sports centre located in East Didsbury, being home to Didsbury Old Bedians RUFC rugby club, Bedians AFC football club and Oisins CLG Gaelic Football club. Old Bedians is located south of Manchester, on the north bank of the River Mersey. It is the principal Gaelic games sports facility in Lancashire and is currently the home grounds of Lancashire GAA and CLG Oisín.

The ground takes its name from the Football and Rugby clubs based on the same site, founded by former students of St Bede's College, Manchester.

Old Bedians RUFC 1st XV compete in Lancashire/Chesire 2 of the RFU North, while the 2nd XV compete in Division 4 East of the  North West Intermediate Rugby Leagues playing fixtures on Saturday afternoon and training every Wednesday evening.

References

External links
 Site
 Old Bedians RUFC rugby club

Gaelic games grounds in England
Didsbury
Sports venues in Manchester
Rugby union stadiums in England
Football venues in Manchester